China Nonferrous Metal Mining (Group) Co., Ltd. (abb. CNMC) is a Chinese corporation involved with the mining of non-ferrous mineral resources. Established in 1983, it is a large central enterprise managed by the State-owned Assets Supervision and Administration Commission of the State Council.

It is managed by the State-owned Assets Supervision and Administration Commission of the State Council.

The company was the parent company of four listed companies in China and in Hong Kong SAR, namely China Non-Ferrous Metal Industry’s Foreign Engineering and Construction Co., Ltd., Ningxia Orient Tantalum Industry Co., Ltd., China Nonferrous Mining Corporation Limited and China Daye Non-Ferrous Metals Mining Limited. It has mines in Zambia, Mongolia and Thailand, and a project in Laos. It invests in copper, aluminum, zinc, nickel, tantalum, niobium, and beryllium.

History
The company was founded in 1983, mainly to carry out international engineering business.
In 2005, with the approval of the state-owned assets supervision, the company changed their name to China Nonferrous Metal Mining.

Leadership
Its president is Mr Luo Tao; its vice-presidents are Qiao Zou and Jiang Hao.

Company developments 
In 2013, the company signed a deal worth US$712 million to construct a steel factory in Iran, thereby defying the sanctions imposed on Tehran by the US and European Union at that time.

As of January 2017, the company is also in talks with Gecamines, a state-owned company of Democratic Republic of Congo (DRC), over a copper mining joint venture.

References

External links

Government-owned companies of China
Chinese companies established in 1983
Companies based in Beijing
Metal companies of China
Non-renewable resource companies established in 1983
1983 establishments in China